The Road to Nashville is a 1967 American musical film directed by Will Zens and starring  Marty Robbins and Connie Smith.

Plot

A Hollywood film company wants to make a movie about country music and sends Doodles Weaver to round up talent to appear. A host of then-current country stars perform their hits.

Cast 
  Marty Robbins  as himself
  Connie Smith  as herself
  Doodles Weaver  as Colonel Feetlebaum
  Richard Arlen  as Studio Boss
  Ralph Emery  as himself
  Johnny Cash  as himself
  June Carter Cash  as herself
  Waylon Jennings  as himself
  Hank Snow  as himself
  Norma Jean  as herself 
  Webb Pierce  as himself
  Kitty Wells  as herself
  Johnnie Wright  as himself
  Ruby Wright  as herself
  Bill Phillips  as himself
  Faron Young  as himself
  Lefty Frizzell  as himself
  Margie Singleton  as herself 
  Bill Anderson  as himself
  Dottie West  as herself 
  Porter Wagoner  as himself
  The Carter Family  as  Themselves  
  The Stoneman Family  as Themselves 
  The Osborne Brothers  as Themselves

References

External links
 

1967 musical films
1967 films
American musical films
Films directed by Will Zens
1960s English-language films
1960s American films